The Cold Cash War is a 1977 science fiction novel by American writer Robert Asprin. Based on an earlier short story of the same title, it is set in a dystopian future.  In this future, corporations, referred to as Zaibatsu, have moved some aspects of their competition from the economic to the military.

The action takes place among mercenary soldiers.  At times, the conflict is under rules of engagement where "killsuits" are used. The killsuit is a reverse powered armor, acting to immobilize the soldier when the on-board computer decides that a lethal hit has been sustained. But, sometimes the rules break down, and lethal weapons and violence are used.

Novels by Robert Asprin
1977 American novels
1977 science fiction novels
Dystopian novels